Abdelmajid Tlemçani (30 November 1937 – 8 July 2020) was a Tunisian footballer.

Biography
Born in 1937, Tlemçani played for Espérance Sportive de Tunis and the Tunisian national team. He is the father of footballer Ziad Tlemçani.

Tlemçani scored the highest number of goals in the Tunisian League twice, with 32 in 1959 and 22 in 1960.

Abdelmajid Tlemçani died on 8 July 2020 and was buried in Jellaz Cemetery the same day.

References

1937 births
2020 deaths
Tunisian footballers
Tunisia international footballers
Association footballers not categorized by position